The Thing Below is a 2004 horror film directed by Jim Wynorski and starring Billy Warlock. It also has the alternate titles It Waits Below and Sea Ghost in Canada, and Ghost Rig 2: The Legend of the Sea Ghost in the UK on DVD.

Premise
A top secret drilling platform in the Gulf of Mexico raises a dormant alien creature from the depths. Once loose, the creature goes on a murderous rampage by telepathically exploiting the fears and desires of anyone to cross its path.

Cast
 Billy Warlock as Captain Jack Griffin
 Michael Rogers as Mr. Paul
 Warren Christie as Cassidy
 Catherine Lough Haggquist as Anna Davis
 Kurt Max Runte as Crank Wowchowski
 Peter Graham-Gaudreau as Dean Rieser

Production

The film used locations in Vancouver and British Columbia.

References

External links
 

2004 films
2004 horror films
2000s horror thriller films
Canadian horror thriller films
English-language Canadian films
Films directed by Jim Wynorski
2000s monster movies
2000s English-language films
2000s Canadian films